Cyclodendron was a genus of lycophytes dating from the Permian. Plants were vascularized with reproduction by spores.

Location

In Brazil, the fossil of indefinite species of the genus Cyclodendron, was located on outcrop Morro Papaléo in the city of Mariana Pimentel. They are in the geopark Paleorrota in Rio Bonito Formation and date from Sakmarian at Permian.

The species C. andreisii was located in Uruguay.

References

Lycophytes
Prehistoric lycophyte genera